Khristo Kachev (born 17 December 1953) is a Bulgarian equestrian. He competed in the team jumping event at the 1980 Summer Olympics.

References

1953 births
Living people
Bulgarian male equestrians
Olympic equestrians of Bulgaria
Equestrians at the 1980 Summer Olympics
Place of birth missing (living people)
20th-century Bulgarian people